The Student Society in Trondheim (Samfundet for short) is Norway's largest student society.

Besides housing a café, a restaurant, several bars and frequently hosting concerts and other activities (among them Norway's biggest culture festival, UKA), it is an independent organization for all students and teachers in Trondheim, owned fully by its members. (At the end of 2011, there are about 9000 members.)

Many famous artists have held concerts here. Among others, Sex Pistols, Iggy Pop, N.E.R.D., Phoenix, Public Enemy, White Lies, Crystal Fighters, Tom McRae, Motörhead, Suede, Motorpsycho, Dum Dum Boys, In Flames and many, many more. Quite a few famous Norwegian bands have started their careers on one of Samfundet's many stages. Some examples are Knutsen & Ludvigsen, deLillos and Postgirobygget.

Every other year world figures attend The Student Society through its festival ISFiT and past speakers include  the Dalai Lama, former Director-General of WHO Gro Harlem Brundtland and Nobel Peace Prize Laureates José Ramos-Horta and Wangari Maathai.

From 1992 to 2014 Samfundet transformed into Trondheim InterRail Center (TIRC) during the summer (from late June to mid August). 
TIRC was started in 1992 by members of the Student Society, and was run by society volunteers every summer.

History
As the Norwegian Institute of Technology (NTH) (later the Norwegian University of Science and Technology, NTNU) opened, September 15, 1910, Trondheim got its first real group of students, and the need for an organized student society soon became apparent. Only one week later, a group of students met and decided to create a student society, and yet one week later, on October 1, Norges Tekniske Høgskolens Studentersamfund ("The student society of NTH") first came into existence.

In the beginning, membership was limited to NTH students; this was later expanded to all students (over 18) in the Trondheim area, and thus, in 1912, the name changed into Studentersamfundet i Trondhjem ("The student society of Trondheim"), which still is its current name, although the city has switched names twice since.

In the first two years, Samfundet did not have its own building, but in 1912, they bought an old abandoned circus building (only called "Circus"), and 15 years later, in 1927, one began the building of the characteristic red round house which is today known as Samfundet. In 1929, the building was finished and the activities were moved. Although Circus was abandoned, the old traditions were carried through by architect Eystein Michaelsen; Storsalen (the main concert hall) still looks very much like a circus.

The building still stands, with active maintenance on a day-to-day basis and bigger projects taking place every two years (related to UKA).

Architecture
It has been said that there were two demands for the original drawings of Samfundet: First of all, it was to have some element of circus (in remembrance of Cirkus, the old building), which has been taken care of in Storsalen.

Second, it was to have elements from mazes. Samfundet is split into two parts, the public and private areas. The public areas can be complicated enough, even though they are mainly dominated by a few larger rooms (most being used as stages of various kind in the weekends) and hallways in-between. However, the private areas, which are normally only open to the staff, is a true maze. There are over 200 rooms, 40 different levels and a true chaos of hallways, doors and even ladders. Nobody has ever managed to get an exact count of how many rooms or doors; attempts to make CAD models of the building have failed (except for a very coarse model used during modelling of the fire extinguisher system), simply because the pieces do not seem to fit together. Most people get lost at least a few times, and the shortest path between two given places can easily involve fifteen or twenty turns and rooms.

Committees
Samfundet is mostly run by its members, more precisely people volunteering for jobs in one of its twenty or so committees (so-called gangs). About a thousand students thus do their share in helping the house (which is known as "the red round house" among its members) keep going, by doing work such as concert booking, doing PA work during concerts, serving food and drinks or managing the internal IT systems. In addition, Samfundet hosts several choirs and other non-technical activities.

References

External links
 Official site (in Norwegian)
 Student-TV (in Norwegian)

1910 establishments in Norway
Music venues in Norway
Trondheim, Student Society in
Norwegian Institute of Technology
Norwegian University of Science and Technology